Eudicella is a genus of small to medium beetles in the subfamily Cetoniinae, belonging to the wider family Scarabaeidae. They are distributed throughout the Afrotropical realm, including South Africa, Rwanda and Zimbabwe.

Species
 Eudicella aethiopica Müller, 1941 
 Eudicella aurata (Westwood, 1841) 
 Eudicella babaulti (Allard, 1982) 
 Eudicella chloe Raffray, 1885 
 Eudicella colmanti Bream, 1907 
 Eudicella cornuta (Heath, 1904) 
 Eudicella cupreosuturalis Bourgoin, 1913 
 Eudicella daphnis (Buquet, 1835) 
 Eudicella darwiniana Kraatz, 1880 
 Eudicella ducalis Kolbe, 1914 
 Eudicella euthalia (Bates, 1881)
 Eudicella frontalis (Westwood, 1843) 
 Eudicella gralli (Buquet, 1836) - Flamboyant Flower Beetle 
 Eudicella hereroensis Kraatz, 1900 
 Eudicella hornimani (Bates, 1877) 
 Eudicella inexpectata Antoine, 1985 
 Eudicella intermedia Allard, 1985 
 Eudicella loricata (Janson, 1877) 
 Eudicella morgani White, 1839 
 Eudicella mutica (Janson, 1915) 
 Eudicella pauperata Kolbe, 1884 
 Eudicella preissi Moser, 1912 
 Eudicella quadrimaculata (Fabricius, 1781) 
 Eudicella ruteri (De Lisle, 1953) 
 Eudicella selene (Kolbe, 1899) 
 Eudicella smithii (MacLeay, 1838) 
 Eudicella tetraspilota (Harold, 1879) 
 Eudicella trimeni (Janson, 1889) 
 Eudicella viridipyga (Lewis, 1879)

References
 Biolib

Cetoniinae